Mysore Road is a metro station on the Purple Line of the Namma Metro serving Muthachari Industrial Estate and Deepanjali Nagar, Bangalore. It was opened to the public on 16 November 2015.

Station layout

Entry/Exits
There are 4 Entry/Exit points – A, B, C and D. Commuters can use either of the points for their travel.

 Entry/Exit point A: Towards Nayandahalli Junction side with wheelchair accessibility
 Entry/Exit point B: Towards Deepanjali Nagar side
 Entry/Exit point C: Towards Outer Ring Road side 
 Entry/Exit point D: Towards Nayandahalli Junction side with wheelchair accessibility

See also
Bangalore
List of Namma Metro stations
Transport in Karnataka
List of metro systems
List of rapid transit systems in India
Metro in bangalore

References

External links

 Bangalore Metro Rail Corporation Ltd. (Official site) 
 UrbanRail.Net – descriptions of all metro systems in the world, each with a schematic map showing all stations.

Namma Metro stations
Railway stations in India opened in 2015
2015 establishments in Karnataka
Railway stations in Bangalore